The Grumman F9F Panther is one of the United States Navy's first successful carrier-based jet fighters, as well as Grumman’s first jet fighter. A single-engined, straight-winged day fighter, it was armed with four  cannons and could carry a wide assortment of air-to-ground munitions.

The Panther was used extensively by the U.S. Navy and Marine Corps in the Korean War. It was also the first jet aircraft used by the Blue Angels aerobatics demonstration team, from 1949 through late 1954. The aircraft was exported to Argentina and was the first jet used by the Argentine Naval Aviation.

Total F9F production was 1,382. The design evolved into the swept wing Grumman F-9 Cougar.

Design and development

Development studies at Grumman for jet-powered fighter aircraft began near the end of World War II as the first jet engines emerged. In a competition for a jet-powered night fighter for the United States Navy, on 3 April 1946 the Douglas F3D Skyknight was selected over Grumman's G-75, a two-seater powered by four Westinghouse J30s. The Navy's Bureau of Aeronautics (BuAer) also issued a contract to Grumman for two G-75 prototype aircraft on 11 April 1946, being given the Navy designation XF9F-1, in case the Skyknight ran into problems.

Grumman soon realized the G-75 was a dead end, but had been working on a completely different, single-engine day fighter, the G-79. In a bureaucratic maneuver, BuAer did not cancel the G-75 contract, but changed the wording to include three prototypes of the entirely different G-79. It became the Panther.

The prototype Panther, piloted by test pilot Corky Meyer, first flew on 21 November 1947. Production aircraft would have a Nene, built under license by Pratt & Whitney as the J42. Since there was insufficient space within the wings and fuselage for fuel for the thirsty jet, permanently mounted wingtip fuel tanks were added, which incidentally improved the fighter's rate of roll.

The F9F was cleared for flight from aircraft carriers in September 1949. During the development phase, Grumman decided to change the Panther's engine, selecting the Pratt & Whitney J48-P-2, a license built version of the Rolls-Royce RB.44 Tay. The other engine that had been tested was the Allison J33-A-16. The armament was a quartet of 20mm guns, the Navy having already switched to this caliber (as opposed to the USAAF/USAF which continued to use .50 caliber M2/M3 guns).

From 1946, a swept-wing version was considered and after concerns about the Panther's inferiority to its MiG opponents in Korea, a conversion, known as Design 93, resulted in a swept-wing derivative, the F9F Cougar, which retained the Panther's designation number.

In 1949, the Panther was considered by the Australian government, as a possible locally-built replacement for the Mustang Mk 23 and De Havilland Vampire then operated by the Royal Australian Air Force (RAAF). The other designs considered initially were an Australian design, the CAC CA-23 (an unconventional, twin-jet all-weather fighter) and the Hawker P.1081. By mid-1950, however, RAAF Mustangs were in action in Korea and seen as highly vulnerable to the MiG-15. An immediately available stop-gap in the shape of the Gloster Meteor F.8 was operated by the RAAF in Korea from July 1951. (After its less-than-satisfactory performance against MiGs, the Meteor was replaced from 1954 by the CAC Sabre – an Australian-built, up-engined variant of the F-86.)

Operational history

US Navy

The Grumman Panther was the primary US Navy and USMC jet fighter and ground-attack aircraft in the Korean War. The Panther was the widest used Navy jet fighter of the war, flying 78,000 sorties. F9F-2s, F9F-3s and F9F-5s, as rugged attack aircraft, were able to sustain operations during intense anti-aircraft fire. The pilots also appreciated the air conditioned cockpit, a welcome change from the humid environment of piston-powered aircraft.

On 3 July 1950, Lieutenant, junior grade Leonard H. Plog, of VF-51, flying an F9F-3 scored the first US Navy air victory of the war by shooting down a propeller-powered Yak-9.

Despite their relatively low speed, Panther pilots also claimed seven Mikoyan-Gurevich MiG-15s, for the loss of two F9Fs.  The first MiG-15 was downed on 9 November 1950, by Lieutenant Commander William (Bill) Amen of VF-111 flying an F9F-2B, during a UN Command attack on the Sinuiju bridges, near the mouth of the Yalu River. Two more MiG-15s were downed on 18 November 1950.

On 18 November 1952 the American aircraft carrier  and three other carriers were operating in the Sea of Japan conducting air strikes against the North Korean city of Hoeryong. The group launched four F9F's for a combat patrol near the North Korean border with China. The group's leader suffered mechanical problems and returned to the carrier together with his wingman. Lt Royce Williams of VF-781, flying off  and his wingman continued on the mission. They then identified seven Soviet Naval Aviation Migs heading towards the task force from the Russian mainland. The naval commanders therefore ordered the two F9F's to position themselves between the Migs and the carrier group.

During this maneuver four Soviet MiG-15s opened fire, despite the fact that the countries were not at war. Williams opened fire on the tail Mig, which dropped out of formation, and was followed down by Williams' wingman. What followed was a 35-minute dogfight between Williams and six MiG-15s. The Mig 15 was a better plane, but Williams nevertheless succeeded in shooting down three more. He ascribed this to both sides doing as they were trained, but the Soviet pilots making mistakes. While heading back to the carriers, Williams was out of ammo, but still had one Mig on his tail. The re-appearance of his wingman on the Mig's tail then scared this one off. By that time Williams's plane was so damaged that he could not turn sideways anymore. Oriskany was therefore aligned with the plane, so he could land. After landing his Panther was found to have 263 hits by cannon shells or fragments and was beyond repair. It was therefore pushed overboard.

The combat is little-known for two reasons. The US feared that publication of the incident could increase tensions with the Soviet Union. Another reason was the involvement of the US National Security Agency (NSA) – the existence of which was then top secret – in planning the mission; the MiGs were intercepted as a result of intelligence provided by the NSA.
The four MiGs that were shot down were flown by Soviet Naval Aviation pilots: Russian sources confirmed Williams' claims, 40 years later, stating the pilots lost were Captains Belyakov and Vandalov, and Lieutenants Pakhomkin and Tarshinov.

Future astronaut Neil Armstrong flew the F9F extensively during the war, although he ejected from one of the aircraft after it was brought down by a wire strung across a valley in 1951. Future astronaut John Glenn and Boston Red Sox all-star baseball player Ted Williams also flew the F9F as Marine Corps pilots.

Panthers were withdrawn from front-line service in 1956, but remained in training roles and with U.S. Naval Air Reserve and U.S. Marine Air Reserve units until 1958. The Navy's Blue Angels flight demonstration team used the Panther for four years, beginning in 1951.  The Panther was the Blue Angels' first jet. Some Panthers continued to serve in small numbers into the 1960s. From September 1962, surviving operational Panthers were designated F-9 within the new combined US tri-service designation system.

Argentine Navy
 

The only foreign buyer of the Panther was the Argentine Naval Aviation, which bought 28 ex-USN F9F-2B aircraft in 1957; the first 10 arrived in 1958. Only 24 aircraft were put in service, the rest were used as spares. The first flight of an Argentine Panther was in December 1958, and the last aircraft was put in service in January 1961.

The catapults on the then only Argentine carrier, ARA Independencia, were considered not powerful enough to launch the F9F, so the aircraft were land-based. However, in July 1963 a Panther (serial 0453/3-A-119) landed on Independencia as part of trials; becoming the first jet to land on an Argentine aircraft carrier.

Argentine Navy F9F-2 Panthers saw combat in the 1963 Argentine Navy Revolt, bombing and strafing a column of the Army 8th Tank Regiment which was advancing on the rebelling Punta Indio Naval Air Base. The attack destroyed several M4 Sherman tanks, at the cost of one F9F Panther shot down.

The Argentine Panthers were involved in the general mobilization during the 1965 border clash between Argentina and Chile but no combat occurred. They were taken out of service in 1969 due to the lack of spare parts and replaced with Douglas A-4Q Skyhawks.

The Argentine Navy also operated the F-9 Cougar trainer version.

Variants

XF9F-2
Prototypes, two built
F9F-2
First production version, powered by Pratt & Whitney J42 engine, 567 built.
F9F-2B
Version fitted with underwing racks for bombs and rockets. As all F9F-2s were brought up to this standard, the B designation was dropped.
F9F-2P
Unarmed photo-reconnaissance version used in Korea, 36 built.
XF9F-3
Prototype for the F9F-3, one built.
F9F-3
Allison J33 powered version produced as insurance against the failure of the J42, with all converted to the J42 later; redesignated F-9B in 1962, 54 built.
XF9F-4
Prototypes used in the development of the F9F-4, two built.
F9F-4
Version with longer fuselage with greater fuel load and powered by J33 engine. Most re-engined with J42s.
F9F-5
Variant of F9F-4, but powered by Pratt & Whitney J48 engine, 616 built. Re-designated F-9D in 1962.
F9F-5P
Unarmed photo-reconnaissance version, with longer nose; redesignated RF-9D in 1962, 36 built.
F9F-5K
After the F9F Panther was withdrawn operational service, a number of F9F-5s were converted into unmanned target drone aircraft; redesignated QF-9D in 1962.
F9F-5KD
Radio controlled drone director conversions for F9F-5K drones; redesignated DF-9E in 1962.

Operators

Argentine Navy - Argentine Naval Aviation

United States Navy
United States Marine Corps

Surviving aircraft

Argentina
On display
F9F-2B
0421/3-A-106 (Argentine Navy) - Gate guardian at Puerto Belgrano Naval Base (Base Naval Puerto Belgrano - BNPB) at Bahía Blanca, Argentina.
0425/3-A-113 (Argentine Navy) - Being restored at Argentine Naval Aviation Museum (:es:Museo de la Aviación Naval Argentina - MUAN) at Bahía Blanca, Argentina.
0452/3-A-111 (Argentine Navy) - Gate guardian at Punta Indio Naval Air Base (Base Aeronaval Punta Indio - BAPI) near La Plata, Argentina.
0453/3-A-118 (Argentine Navy) - Displayed at National Naval Museum (:es:Museo Naval de la Nación) at Tigre, Argentina.

United States
Airworthy
F9F-2B

123078 Cavanaugh Flight Museum in Addison, Texas.
On display
F9F-2
123050 - National Naval Aviation Museum at Naval Air Station Pensacola, Florida.
123557 - VFW Post 1621 in Janesville, Wisconsin.
123612 - NAS Oceana Air Park, Naval Air Station Oceana, Virginia.
123652 - Flying Leatherneck Aviation Museum, Marine Corps Air Station Miramar, California.
125183 - Pima Air & Space Museum, adjacent to Davis-Monthan AFB in Tucson, Arizona.
127120 - Wings of Freedom Aviation Museum at the former NAS JRB Willow Grove in Horsham, Pennsylvania.
F9F-2B
123526 - National Museum of the Marine Corps, adjacent to Marine Corps Base Quantico in Triangle, Virginia.
F9F-4
125180 - Lion's Park in Costa Mesa, California.
F9F-5
bureau number unknown (incorrectly marked as 141136) - USS Midway Museum in San Diego, California
125295 - Valiant Air Command Warbird Museum at Space Coast Regional Airport in Titusville, Florida.
125992 - Aviation Heritage Park in Bowling Green, KY.
126226 - Combat Air Museum adjacent to Forbes Air National Guard Base at Topeka Regional Airport / Forbes Field (former Forbes AFB) in Topeka, Kansas.
126275 - Battleship Memorial Park in Mobile, Alabama.
F9F-5P
125316 - Palm Springs Air Museum, Palm Springs, California. 
126277 - Planes of Fame Air Museum, Chino, California.
Under restoration or in storage
F9F-2
123054 - under restoration at Yanks Air Museum in Chino, California. 
123092 - in storage for restoration at USS John F. Kennedy Museum in North Kingston, Rhode Island.	
123420 - in storage at Fantasy of Flight in Polk City, Florida.
F9F-5
125467 - in storage by private owner in Bulverde, Texas.

Specifications (F9F-5 Panther)

Notable appearances in media

The F9F Panther was featured in the 1954 Korean War film The Bridges at Toko-Ri starring William Holden, Grace Kelly, Mickey Rooney and Fredric March, and in Men of the Fighting Lady starring Van Johnson, Walter Pidgeon and Keenan Wynn. 

In the 1990 movie, The Hunt for Red October, footage of an F9F crashing into the fantail of the USS Midway (CV-41) is used in place of an F-14A, which crashes into the USS Enterprise (CVN-65).

See also

References

Notes

Bibliography

 Danby, Peter A. United States Navy Serials 1941 to 1976. Merseyside Aviation Society, Liverpool, England, 1977. .
 Francillon, René J. Grumman Aircraft since 1929. London :Putnam, 1989. . 
 Grossnick, Roy and William J. Armstrong. United States Naval Aviation, 1910-1995. Annapolis, Maryland: Naval Historical Center, 1997. .
 Hardy, Michael John. Sea, Sky and Stars: An Illustrated History of Grumman Aircraft. London: Arms & Armour Press, 1987. .
 Kott, Richard C. "Attack from the Sky". in Marolda, Edward (ed.). The United States Navy in the Korean War. Annapolis, Maryland: Naval Institute Press, 2007. .
 Meyer, Corwin H. "Grumman Panther". Flight Journal, October 2002.
 Schnitzer, George. Panthers Over Korea. Baltimore, Maryland: Publish America, 2007. .
 Sullivan, Jim. F9F Panther/Cougar in action. Carrollton, Texas: Squadron/Signal Publications, 1982. .
 Swanborough, Gordon and Peter M. Bowers. United States Navy Aircraft since 1911. London: Putnam, 1976. .
 Taylor, John W.R. "Grumman F9F Cougar". Combat Aircraft of the World from 1909 to the Present. New York: G.P. Putnam's Sons, 1969. .
 Winchester, Jim, ed. "Grumman F9F Panther". Military Aircraft of the Cold War (The Aviation Factfile). London: Grange Books plc, 2006. .

Online sources

Further reading 
 
 
 

Schnitzer, George. (2007) Panthers Over Korea. Baltimore, Maryland: Publish America, 2007. .

External links

U.S. Navy Naval Aviation News article on the F9F Panther 
The Grumman F9F Panther/Cougar at Airvectors
July 23, 1951 F9F Panther crash on USS Midway

F09F1 Panther
1940s United States fighter aircraft
Single-engined jet aircraft
Low-wing aircraft
Carrier-based aircraft
Aircraft first flown in 1947
Cruciform tail aircraft